Ingmanthorpe is a hamlet in Brampton, Derbyshire, England.

Hamlets in Derbyshire
North East Derbyshire District